Eslam Mosbah (born 1984) is an Egyptian novelist. He is best known for his 2011 novel Status: Emo which was described by Alaa Al Aswany as one of the best Arabic novels of the decade. It has since been translated into English by Raphael Cohen.

References

Egyptian writers
1984 births
Living people